is a passenger railway station located in the city of Kuwana,  Mie Prefecture, Japan, operated by the private railway operator Yōrō Railway.

Lines

Station layout
The station consists of one unnumbered island platform connected to the station building by a level crossing.

Platforms

Adjacent stations 

|-
!colspan=5|Yōrō Railway

History
Shimo-Fukaya Station opened on August 1, 1921 as a station on the Yōrō Railway. The Yōrō Railway became the Ise Electric Railway’s Yōrō Line on October 1, 1929, but re-emerged as the Yōrō Railway on April 20, 1936. It merged with the Sangu Electric Railway on August 1, 1940, and through a series of mergers became part of the Kansai Express Railway on June 1, 1944. The line was split off into the new Yōrō Railway on October 1, 2007.

Passenger statistics
In fiscal 2019, the station was used by an average of 562 passengers daily (boarding passengers only).

Surrounding area
Mie Prefectural Kuwana Kita High School
Kuwana City Fukaya Elementary School

See also
 List of Railway Stations in Japan

References

External links

 Yōrō Railway Official website 

Railway stations in Japan opened in 1921
Railway stations in Mie Prefecture
Stations of Yōrō Railway
Kuwana, Mie